
Shri Vidya (sometimes also spelled Sri Vidya or Shree Vidya) is a Hindu Tantric religious system devoted to the Goddess as Lalitā Tripurasundarī (Beautiful Goddess of the Three worlds), Bhuvaneshvari, and Lakshmi. 

The sect accepts and aims to provide both material prosperity and self-realisation. It has an extensive literature. Details of belief vary in different texts but the general principles are similar to those found in Kashmir Shaivism.  

In the principally Shakta theology of  the goddess is supreme, transcending the cosmos that is her manifestation.

Major texts
 Bhavana Upanishad
 Parasurama Kalpasutra
 Sarada Tilaka
 Saundarya Lahari
 Tripura Rahasya

References

Citations

Works cited

Further reading

 
 

Hindu tantra
Shaktism